Lucien Lublin (1909, Brest-Litovsk – 1995) was a French electrical engineer. A socialist Zionist who became a leader of the French Jewish Resistance during World War II with Abraham Polonski and David Knout. Lublin had been a member of the Zionist Labor Movement before the war.

After the World War II, Lublin created the Society for Protecting Jewish Children, a charity which helped Jewish children who had survived the Holocaust and took them to Palestine.

References
 Abraham Polonski and the Jewish resistance in France during the Second World War by Yehuda Ben-David, Yaʻel Zaidman, Miśrad ha-bitaḥon, 2002
 L'armée juive clandestine en France: 1940-1945 by Raphaël Delpard, Page après page, 2002.
 Les Juifs dans la résistance et la libération: histoire, témoignages, débats by Yves-Claude Aouate, Anne Grynberg, 1985.
 Contribution à l'histoire de la résistance juive en France, 1940-1944 by David Knout. Editions du Centre, 1947.

1909 births
1995 deaths
Belarusian Jews
Belarusian socialists
Belarusian Zionists
French electrical engineers
French socialists
Jews in the French resistance
French Zionists
Jewish socialists
Labor Zionists
People from Brest, Belarus